William Clifford Clark, CMG (April 18, 1889 – December 27, 1952) was a Canadian professor, economist, and civil servant.

He earned his MA from Queen's University receiving honours in Latin, French, English, History, and Political and Economic Science and did graduate studies in economics with F. W. Taussig at Harvard. He returned to teach at Queen's in 1915 where he became the first head of the Commerce program in 1919. In 1921, Clark left to work for American investment firm S. W. Straus and Company, returning to Queen's after the company went bankrupt in the Great Depression.

At the instigation of Oscar D. Skelton, Clark wrote a well-received memorandum on monetary policy for the 1932 British Empire Economic Conference in Ottawa. Shortly afterwards, he was appointed Deputy Minister in the Department of Finance by R. B. Bennett, a position he held until his death in 1952. As deputy minister, he helped to establish the Bank of Canada in 1934,  chaired the World War II Economic Advisory Committee, and helped convince Mackenzie King to adopt the 1944 Family Allowance Bill. He was appointed a Companion of the Order of St Michael and St George in 1935.

Works
 1918: (with Eric Walter Zimmerman) Foreign Trade and Shipping, volume 15 in Modern Business series of Alexander Hamilton Institute, New York, link from Internet Archive.
 In Bulletin of the Department of History and Political Science at Queen's University: 
 1916: The country elevator in the Canadian West
 1918: Should maximum prices be fixed?
 1921: Business cycles and the depression of 1920-1.

References

 Robert Wardhaugh, Behind the Scenes: the Life and Work of William Clifford Clark (Toronto: University of Toronto Press, 2010)
 J.L. Granatstein, The Ottawa Men: The Civil Service Mandarins 1935-1957 (Toronto: Oxford University Press, 1982) 
 Clifford Clark at The Canadian Encyclopedia

External links 
 Clifford Clark at The Canadian Encyclopedia

1889 births
1952 deaths
20th-century Canadian civil servants
Canadian economists
Queen's University at Kingston alumni
Academic staff of Queen's University at Kingston
Harvard Graduate School of Arts and Sciences alumni
Persons of National Historic Significance (Canada)
Canadian Companions of the Order of St Michael and St George
Presidents of the Canadian Political Science Association
20th-century political scientists